In Greek mythology, Carnus (also spelled Carneus and Carneius) (Ancient Greek: Κάρνος) was a seer from Acarnania, who was instructed in the art of divination by Apollo. According to the poet Praxilla, he was a son of Europa, who was brought up by Apollo and Leto. Alternatively, he was Apollo's lover and friend in some accounts. 

Carnus accompanied the Heracleidae, and was killed by Hippotes with a spear for giving obscure prophecies. Apollo then struck the Dorians with plague; having consulted an oracle, they banished Hippotes from their camp and established a cult of Apollo Carneius to propitiate the god.

Notes

References

 Conon, Fifty Narrations, surviving as one-paragraph summaries in the Bibliotheca (Library) of Photius, Patriarch of Constantinople translated from the Greek by Brady Kiesling. Online version at the Topos Text Project.

Pausanias, Description of Greece with an English Translation by W.H.S. Jones, Litt.D., and H.A. Ormerod, M.A., in 4 Volumes. Cambridge, MA, Harvard University Press; London, William Heinemann Ltd. 1918. Online version at the Perseus Digital Library
Pausanias, Graeciae Descriptio. 3 vols. Leipzig, Teubner. 1903.  Greek text available at the Perseus Digital Library.
Scholia on Theocritus, Idyll 5.83

Mythological Greek seers
Children of Zeus
Male lovers of Apollo
LGBT themes in Greek mythology